Cape Cà Mau (Mũi Cà Mau) is a cape on the Cà Mau Peninsula in Vietnam. It is near the southernmost tip of the Vietnamese mainland.

Gallery

See also
Cape Ca Mau National Park

References

Landforms of Vietnam
Landforms of Cà Mau province
Headlands of Asia